How to Master the Video Games is a paperback book written by Tom Hirschfeld and published by Bantam Books in 1981. It is a guidebook exploring 30 of the most popular arcade games of its time. Hisrchfeld divides the included games into broad categories in the table of contents: Space Invaders-type, Asteroids-type, maze, reflex, and miscellaneous. Space Invaders-type corresponds to the modern genre of fixed shooter, while Asteroids-type is now called multidirectional shooter.

The book was followed by How to Master Home Video Games in 1982 by the same author.

Reception
How to Master the Video Games sold about 650,000 copies, appearing on The New York Times mass-market paperback list.

Stanley Greenlaw reviewed the book for Computer Gaming World, and stated that "The book is just the ticket for the game player who wants to be more than a novice. If you really want to enjoy the coin-operated arcades take a few of those spare quarters and pick up How to Master the Video Games, you'll come out ahead in the long run."

References

External links
Review in Electronic Games
Review in Games

1981 non-fiction books
Books about video games